Manolo Guindani (born 12 January 1971, in Cremona) is an Italian manager and retired footballer. He played as a midfielder. In 1993–94 season he played for Cremonese in Serie A. He then played in Serie B, Serie C1 and Serie C2.

After his retirement he began a new career as a coach and managed Palazzolo, Este, Castellana and Fanfulla.

Career as a player
1989–1990 Orceana 2 (0) 
1990–1991 Pergocrema 19 (0) 
1991–1992 Cremonese 0 (0) 
1992–1993 → Vastese 31 (1) 
1993–1994 Cremonese 2 (0) 
1994–1995 Novara 25 (0) 
1995–1996 Palazzolo 13 (2) 
1996–1997 Pavia 29 (0) 
1997–1999 Fidenza 56 (3) 
1999–2000 Casale 6 (0) 
2000 Pizzighettone 19 (1) 
2000-2001 Crociati Noceto 27 (2)
2001–2002 Mezzolara 26 (0) 
2002–2004 Chiari 58 (5) 
2004–2005 Castellana 25 (3)

Career as a manager
2005–2006 Palazzolo 
2006–2007 Este 
2007–2008 Castellana
2008–   Fanfulla

See also
Football in Italy
List of football clubs in Italy

Notes

Living people
1971 births
Association football forwards
Italian footballers